Nunatakassaup Sermia may refer to the following glaciers in Greenland:

 Nunatakassaup Sermia, a glacier in Melville Bay in northwestern Greenland
 Nunatakassaup Sermia (Tasiusaq Bay), a glacier in Tasiusaq Bay in northwestern Greenland